Muhammad Reazuddin Ahmed (24 October 1929 – 14 February 1997), popularly known by his daak naam Bhola Mia, was a Bangladeshi politician, lawyer and minister. He was a Member of Parliament for the then Rangpur-13, then Rangpur-15 and Lalmonirhat-3 constituencies. He was the Deputy Speaker of the 4th Parliament of Bangladesh.

Early life and education 
Ahmed was born on 24 October 1929 to a Bengali Muslim family in Lalmonirhat (then under Kurigram), Rangpur district, Bengal Province. His father, Dalaluddin Ahmed, was a renowned wakil of Kurigram, and his mother's name was Rahimah Begum. He received his Bachelor of Arts from the University of Calcutta in 1945, and became associated with politics whilst enrolling for law. He thereafter left education to pursue his political career.

Career 
Riaz Uddin Ahmed was a lawyer and organiser of the Bangladesh Liberation War. He played an active role in all the political activities of the time including the Six Point Movement, Bengali Language Movement and participation in the war.

He was elected a Member of Parliament from the then Rangpur-13 constituency as a candidate of Bangladesh Awami League in the first parliamentary elections of 1973.

He joined the Bangladesh Nationalist Party and was elected as a Member of Parliament from the then Rangpur-15 constituency as a candidate of the Bangladesh Nationalist Party in the second parliamentary elections of 1979.

In the cabinet of Abdus Sattar, he first served as the Minister of Labor and Industrial Welfare and later as the Minister of Agriculture, Labor and Social Welfare. He then joined the Jatiya Party. He was elected Member of Parliament from Lalmonirhat-3 constituency as a candidate of Jatiya Party in the 4th Jatiya Sangsad elections of 1988 and 5th Jatiya Sangsad of 1991. On April 25, 1988, he was appointed Deputy Speaker. He held the post till April 4, 1991.

Death
Reazuddin Ahmed died in Lalmonirhat on 14 February 1997.

References 

1929 births
1997 deaths
Jatiya Party politicians
Deputy Speakers of the Jatiya Sangsad
5th Jatiya Sangsad members
4th Jatiya Sangsad members
1st Jatiya Sangsad members
2nd Jatiya Sangsad members
20th-century Pakistani lawyers
People of the Bangladesh Liberation War
People from Lalmonirhat District
University of Calcutta alumni